National Route 64 (N64) forms part of the Philippine highway network. It runs through northern Cavite.

Route description

Kawit to Tanza 

The northern section of N64 forms a physical continuation of E3 (Manila–Cavite Expressway) from Metro Manila. It runs along the Centennial Road, parallel to the coast of Cavite, bypassing Kawit, Imus, Noveleta, Rosario, General Trias, and Tanza. It forms a part of the Radial Road 1 of Metro Manila's arterial road network.

Its section between General Trias Drive in General Trias and Santa Cruz Street in Tanza forms part of the Noveleta–Naic–Tagaytay Road network.

Tanza to Trece Martires 

At the junction in Tanza, N64 turns inland as Tanza–Trece Martires Road, a 2- to 4-lane primary road to Trece Martires.

References

Roads in Cavite